German cruiser Karlsruhe may refer to:
 ,  German light cruiser, launched 1912, sunk 1914.
 ,   German light cruiser, launched 1916, scuttled 1919.
  (1927),   German light cruiser, launched 1927, sunk 1940.

Others 
 Ersatz Karlsruhe,  German World War I light cruiser. Not completed, scrapped in 1920.

See also 
 Karlsruhe (disambiguation) for other uses of the name Karlsruhe and ship names (Karlsruhe).

German Navy ship names